Berlinette is the second solo studio album by German electronic musician Ellen Allien. It was released on BPitch Control on 7 April 2003.

Critical reception

Mark Pytlik of AllMusic gave the album 4.5 stars out of 5, saying, "Bitingly fierce, technologically adroit, and curiously poppy, Berlinette marks yet another high point in an already superb year for Germanic techno." Todd Burns of Stylus Magazine gave the album a grade of B−, commenting that "Much of the charm of this album lies in the seemingly complex drum programming that Allien brings to the mix."

Pitchfork placed it at number 27 on the "Top 50 Albums of 2003" list.

Track listing

Personnel
Credits adapted from liner notes.

 Ellen Allien – vocals, production
 Sascha Ring – some drums
 Stephan Szulzewsky – guitar (3)
 Samuel Ingold – guitar (6, 7, 11)
 Honza – artwork
 Kritzla – font

Charts

References

External links
 

2003 albums
Ellen Allien albums
BPitch Control albums